Dichromodes niger is a moth of the family Geometridae. It is endemic to New Zealand.

References

Oenochrominae
Moths described in 1877
Moths of New Zealand
Endemic fauna of New Zealand
Taxa named by Arthur Gardiner Butler
Endemic moths of New Zealand